Igor Oca Pulido (born 7 May 1981) is a Spanish football manager, currently in charge of Ecuadorian club Universidad Católica del Ecuador.

Career
Born in Basauri, Biscay, Basque Country, Oca began his managerial career with Levante UD's Juvenil D side in 2011, after previously working as a fitness coach for the youth teams of Villarreal CF, Real Sociedad and Athletic Bilbao. On 5 June 2014, he was named in charge of the Juvenil A squad of the former.

On 8 July 2016, Oca was appointed manager of Atlético Madrid's Juvenil División de Honor team. Ahead of the 2017–18 season, he initially took over Deportivo Alavés' Juvenil A squad, before replacing Aitor Orueta at the helm of the reserves on 3 October 2017.

Oca was dismissed by the Miniglorias on 4 March 2019, being replaced by Iñaki Alonso. On 30 May, he moved abroad after being named assistant manager of Mexican club Atlético San Luis, being also in charge of their under-20 team.

Oca returned to his home country on 8 December 2020, after being appointed in charge of Tercera División side Sestao River Club. The following 15 June, after achieving promotion to Segunda División RFEF, he left the club.

On 25 August 2021, Oca moved to Ecuador and joined Ismael Rescalvo's staff at Emelec, as his assistant. On 24 March of the following year, he moved to fellow league team Independiente del Valle, as the new Head of Youth Football.

On 28 November 2022, Oca returned to managerial duties after being named manager of Universidad Católica del Ecuador.

Managerial statistics

References

External links

1981 births
Living people
Sportspeople from Biscay
Spanish football managers
Tercera División managers
Deportivo Alavés B managers
Sestao River managers
C.D. Universidad Católica del Ecuador managers
Spanish expatriate football managers
Spanish expatriate sportspeople in Mexico
Spanish expatriate sportspeople in Ecuador
Expatriate football managers in Ecuador